Jiřina is a Czech given name for females which may refer to:

Jiřina Bohdalová (b. 1931), actress and TV personality
Jiřina Hauková (1919–2005), poet and translator
Jirina Marton (born 1946), Czech-born Canadian artist and illustrator
Jiřina Nekolová (1931-2011), figure skater
Jiřina Petrovická (1923–2008), film actress
Jiřina Ptáčníková (b. 1986),  pole vaulter
Jiřina Šejbalová (1905-1981) actress
Jiřina Steimarová (1916–2007), film and television actress
Jiřina Štěpničková (1912–1985), actress
Jiřina Švorcová (1928 –2011), actress and pro-Communist activist
Jiřina Třebická (1930– 2005), dancer and actress.

See also
Jiří (disambiguation)
Jiri (disambiguation)

Czech feminine given names

br:Jiřina
cs:Jiřina
de:Jiřina